Goniurosaurus catbaensis, also known as the Cat Ba leopard gecko or Cat Ba tiger gecko is a gecko endemic to Cát Bà Island in Vietnam.

References

Goniurosaurus
Reptiles of Vietnam
Reptiles described in 2008